Matias Loppi is a Finnish professional ice hockey forward who currently plays for SV Caldaro of the italian Serie A2.

References

External links

1980 births
Living people
Lahti Pelicans players
Ice hockey people from Helsinki
Finnish ice hockey forwards